Foxhunter (1940–1959) was a champion show jumping horse ridden by Harry Llewellyn, best known for their part in securing Great Britain's only gold medal at the 1952 Summer Olympics (in the Team Jumping equestrian event).

They also were part of the British Show Jumping Team at the 1948 Summer Olympics, winning the bronze medal, and at many other international events.

Foxhunter and Llewellyn are the only horse and rider to win the King George V Gold Cup three times (in 1948, 1950, and 1953), and won 78 international competitions during their joint career.

Llewellyn bought Foxhunter, a golden-bay gelding, in 1947 following a search that began by studying the records of every registered showjumper on file with the British Show Jumping Association.

Death and legacy
Foxhunter died in 1959. His skeleton was preserved and donated to the Royal Veterinary College, where it was put on permanent display in the college's Anatomy Museum.

Foxhunter's hide was buried on the Blorenge mountain, between Abergavenny and Blaenavon. A memorial plaque listing Foxhunter's achievements marks the Blorenge site and a car park is situated nearby. When Sir Harry died in 1999 his ashes were scattered around the horse's memorial.

The Foxhunter Championship for novice horses at the annual Horse of the Year Show was named after Foxhunter, and was first held in 1954.

References

External links
 Foxhunter memorial plaque

Show jumping horses
1940 animal births
1959 animal deaths
Individual male horses
Byerley Turk sire line